Mitochondrially encoded tRNA serine 1 (UCN) also known as MT-TS1 is a transfer RNA which in humans is encoded by the mitochondrial MT-TS1 gene.

MT-TS1 is a small 69 nucleotide RNA (human mitochondrial map position 7446-7514) that transfers the amino acid serine to a growing polypeptide chain at the ribosome site of protein synthesis during translation.

External links
  GeneReviews/NCBI/NIH/UW entry on Nonsyndromic Hearing Loss and Deafness, Mitochondrial

References